The Agriculture Building is a historic state government office building located at Raleigh, Wake County, North Carolina.  It was built between 1921 and 1923, and is a five-story, Classical Revival.  It is sheathed in warm yellow stone, with massive, ashlar veneer, on the ground floor.  An addition was built in the 1950s, giving the building an "L"-shape.

It was listed on the National Register of Historic Places in 1976. The Agriculture Building is a Raleigh Historic Landmark and located in the Capitol Area Historic District.

References

External links

 North Carolina Department of Agriculture

Government buildings on the National Register of Historic Places in North Carolina
Neoclassical architecture in North Carolina
Government buildings completed in 1923
Buildings and structures in Raleigh, North Carolina
National Register of Historic Places in Raleigh, North Carolina
Historic district contributing properties in North Carolina